Andrew Augustine Caffrey (October 2, 1920 – October 6, 1993) was a United States district judge of the United States District Court for the District of Massachusetts.

Education and career
Born in Lawrence, Massachusetts, Caffrey received an Artium Baccalaureus degree from the College of the Holy Cross in 1941. He served in the United States Army from May 20, 1944 to July 2, 1946. He was a lieutenant in the United States Army Signal Corps, Intelligence Branch. He then received a Bachelor of Laws in 1948 from Boston College Law School and a Master of Laws from Harvard Law School in the same year. He was an associate professor at Boston College Law School from 1948 to 1955. He was Chief of the Civil Division of the Office of United States Attorney for the District of Massachusetts from 1955 to 1959, and First Assistant United States Attorney in that office from 1959 to 1960.

Federal judicial service

Caffrey received a recess appointment from President Dwight D. Eisenhower on October 13, 1960, to a seat on the United States District Court for the District of Massachusetts vacated by Judge William T. McCarthy. He was nominated to the same position by President Eisenhower on January 10, 1961. He was confirmed by the United States Senate on August 9, 1961, and received his commission from President John F. Kennedy on August 16, 1961. He served as Chief Judge from 1972 to 1986. He was a member of the Judicial Conference of the United States from 1973 to 1979. He was a member of the Judicial Panel on Multidistrict Litigation from 1975 to 1990, serving as Chair of that panel from 1980 to 1990. He assumed senior status on October 17, 1986. His service terminated on October 6, 1993, due to his death in West Palm Beach, Florida.

References

Sources

Judges of the United States (1983)

External links

1920 births
1993 deaths
College of the Holy Cross alumni
Harvard Law School alumni
Boston College Law School alumni
Judges of the United States District Court for the District of Massachusetts
United States district court judges appointed by Dwight D. Eisenhower
20th-century American judges
20th-century American lawyers
Assistant United States Attorneys
United States Army personnel of World War II
United States Army officers